Johny Erlandsson (born 11 September 1955) is a former Swedish football player.

During his club career, Erlandsson played for Kalmar FF.

Erlandsson made 4 appearances for the Sweden national football team, coming between 1977 and 1981.

External links

1955 births
Swedish footballers
Sweden international footballers
Kalmar FF players
Association football forwards
Living people